Adams Homestead and Nature Preserve is a South Dakota state park in Union County, South Dakota in the United States. The former Stephen Searls Adams homestead property dates to 1872 and covers 1500 acres on the Missouri River. The property was donated in 1984 and the park was established in 1997. The park is open for year-round recreation including hiking and cross country skiing.

See also
List of South Dakota state parks

References

External links
 Adams Homestead and Nature Preserve

Protected areas of Union County, South Dakota
State parks of South Dakota